Vännäsby is a locality situated in Vännäs Municipality, Västerbotten County, Sweden with 1,552 inhabitants in 2010.

References 

Populated places in Västerbotten County
Populated places in Vännäs Municipality